Gemmula mystica is a species of sea snail, a marine gastropod mollusk in the family Turridae, the turrids.

Description
The length of the shell attains 15 mm.

Distribution
This bathyal species occurs in the Atlantic Ocean off Brazil.

References

 Simone, L. R. L. (2005). A new species of Gemmula (Caenogastropoda Turridae) from Brazilian deep waters. Strombus. 12: 7-10.

External links
 Gastropods.com: Gemmula mystica

mystica
Gastropods described in 2005